Andrius Gintarasovich Rukas (born 4 September 1996) is a Russian football player of Lithuanian descent. He plays for FC Yenisey-2 Krasnoyarsk.

Club career
He made his debut in the Russian Football National League for FC Tom Tomsk on 9 March 2020 in a game against FC Khimki. He started the game and played the full match.

Personal life
His twin brother Tomas Rukas is also a footballer.

References

External links
 Profile by Russian Football National League
 
 
 

1996 births
People from Raseiniai District Municipality
Russian people of Lithuanian descent
Twin sportspeople
Russian twins
Living people
Russian footballers
Russia youth international footballers
Association football defenders
FC Sibir Novosibirsk players
FC Dynamo Moscow reserves players
FC Arsenal Tula players
U.D. Leiria players
G.D. Peniche players
FC Tom Tomsk players
FC Irtysh Omsk players
FC Yenisey Krasnoyarsk players
Campeonato de Portugal (league) players
Russian First League players
Russian expatriate footballers
Expatriate footballers in Portugal